Lucy Neal Dahl (born 4 August 1965) is a British screenwriter. She is the daughter of British author Roald Dahl and American actress Patricia Neal.

Career
Dahl wrote the screenplay for Wild Child and served as a consultant on Charlie and the Chocolate Factory, based on her father's book of the same name. She is also a content contributor to the online food and wine magazine Zester Daily.

Personal life
Dahl was born at John Radcliffe Hospital in Oxford, She has been married twice. She married first, in 1987, Michael Faircloth, with whom she has two daughters, Phoebe Dahl (born 4 November 1988) and Chloe Michaela Dahl (born 12 September 1990). The couple divorced in 1991. Dahl's second marriage was in 2002, to John LaViolette. They divorced in 2016.

References

External links

1965 births
Living people
British women screenwriters
English people of American descent
English people of Norwegian descent
English people of Welsh descent
Lucy